The 2000 NFL season was the 81st regular season of the National Football League (NFL). The season ended with Super Bowl XXXV when the Baltimore Ravens defeated the New York Giants, 34–7, at Raymond James Stadium in Tampa, Florida.

Week 1 of the season reverted to Labor Day weekend in 2000. It would be the last NFL season to date to start on Labor Day weekend. It would also be the last time until 2015 that CBS televised the late afternoon games in Week 1, because both Week 1 of the NFL season and CBS's coverage of the U.S. Open tennis finals would take place on the same day beginning next season.

Player movement
July 24: The Carolina Panthers sign defensive end Reggie White. 
July 21: The Baltimore Ravens sign tight end Ben Coates. 
July 24: The San Diego Chargers sign linebacker Steve Tovar. 
July 25: The Carolina Panthers sign defensive end Eric Swann. 
July 26: The Seattle Seahawks sign wide receiver Sean Dawkins. 
July 28: The Chicago Bears sign kicker Michael Husted.

Trades
July 11: The Green Bay Packers trade tight end Lawrence Hart to the New Orleans Saints for running back Marvin Powell.
July 31: The Green Bay Packers trade quarterback Aaron Brooks and tight end Lamont Hall to the New Orleans Saints for linebacker K.D. Williams.

Draft
The 2000 NFL draft was held from April 15 to 16, 2000 at New York City's Theater at Madison Square Garden. With the first pick, the Cleveland Browns selected defensive end Courtney Brown from Pennsylvania State University. Taken by the New England Patriots with the 199th pick in the sixth round was Michigan quarterback Tom Brady. Tom Brady went on to win 3 NFL MVP awards, a record 7 Super Bowl titles and 5 Super Bowl MVP awards.

Major rule changes
In order to cut down on group celebrations, unsportsmanlike conduct penalties and fines will be assessed for celebrations by two or more players.
Anyone wearing an eligible number (1 to 49 or 80 to 89) can play quarterback without having to first report to the referee before a play.
This rule change resulted in the increase of trick plays teams can employ on offense.
The “Bert Emanuel” rule was implemented, stating that when making a catch and falling to the ground, the ball is allowed to touch the ground and still be considered a catch if the player maintains clear control of the ball.

2000 deaths

Pro Football Hall of Fame members
Tom Fears Fears played 9 seasons as an end for the Los Angeles Rams and was inducted into the Hall of Fame in 1970. He was a 3-time NFL champion (1951, 1962, 1965), he was named First-team All-Pro in 1950, and was a member of the 1950s All-Decade Team. He was the first Mexican born player inducted into the Hall of Fame. He died January 4, aged 77
Derrick Thomas Thomas played 11 seasons for the Kansas City Chiefs. He was a 6-time All-Pro selection (1st team 1990–1992, 2nd team 1993, 1994, 1996) and a 9-time Pro Bowl selection (1989–1997). He was named to the 1990s All-Decade Team. He owns NFL record for sacks in a game with 7, which he achieved in 1990. He was posthumously inducted into the Hall of Fame in 2009. He died February 8, aged 33.
Tom Landry Landry was the first head coach of the Dallas Cowboys. He won 2 Super Bowls VI and XII.  He was inducted into the Hall of Fame in 1990. He died February 12, aged 75.

Others
Tony Adamle
Tom Day
Steve Furness
John Garlington
John Hock
Don Kindt
Fred Lane
Woodley Lewis
Bill Munson
Hampton Pool
Tobin Rote
Dan Turk
Eric Turner

Regular season

Scheduling formula

Highlights of the 2000 season included:
Thanksgiving: Two games were played on Thursday, November 23, featuring New England at Detroit and the Minnesota at Dallas, with Detroit and Minnesota winning.

Final regular season standings

Tiebreakers
Green Bay finished ahead of Detroit in the NFC Central based on better division record (5–3 to Lions' 3–5).
New Orleans finished ahead of St. Louis in the NFC West based on better division record (7–1 to Rams' 5–3).
Tampa Bay was the second NFC Wild Card based on head-to-head victory over St. Louis (1–0).

Playoffs

AFC
Wild-Card playoffs: Miami 23, Indianapolis 17 (OT); Baltimore 21, Denver 3
Divisional playoffs: Oakland 27, Miami 0; Baltimore 24, Tennessee 10
AFC Championship: Baltimore 16, Oakland 3 at Network Associates Coliseum, Oakland, California, January 14, 2001

NFC
Wild-Card playoffs: New Orleans 31, St. Louis 28; Philadelphia 21, Tampa Bay 3
Divisional playoffs: Minnesota 34, New Orleans 16; N.Y. Giants 20, Philadelphia 10
NFC Championship: N.Y. Giants 41, Minnesota 0 at Giants Stadium, East Rutherford, New Jersey, January 14, 2001

Super Bowl
Super Bowl XXXV: Baltimore (AFC) 34, N.Y. Giants (NFC) 7 at Raymond James Stadium, Tampa, Florida, January 28, 2001

Milestones
The following teams and players set all-time NFL records during the season:

Statistical leaders

Team

Individual

Awards

Coaching changes
Arizona Cardinals – Vince Tobin fired seven games into season; replaced by Dave McGinnis. McGinnis held job through the 2003 season. 
Cincinnati Bengals – Dick LeBeau; replaced Bruce Coslet who was fired during the 2000 season.
Dallas Cowboys – Dave Campo; replaced Chan Gailey who was fired after the 1999 season.
Green Bay Packers – Mike Sherman; replaced Ray Rhodes who was fired after the 1999 season.
Miami Dolphins – Dave Wannstedt; replaced Jimmy Johnson who retired after the 1999 season.
New England Patriots – Bill Belichick; replaced Pete Carroll who was fired after the 1999 season.
New Orleans Saints – Jim Haslett; replaced Mike Ditka who was fired after the 1999 season.
New York Jets – Al Groh; replaced Bill Belichick who replaced Bill Parcells who retired to become the full-time General Manager after the 1999 season.  Belichick was hired by the New England Patriots shortly after he resigned from the Jets.
St. Louis Rams – Mike Martz; replaced Dick Vermeil who retired after winning Super Bowl XXXIV.

Stadium changes
 The Cincinnati Bengals moved from Cinergy Field to Paul Brown Stadium, named after team founder Paul Brown
 The Seattle Seahawks began playing at Husky Stadium while the Kingdome was demolished and a new Seahawks stadium built in its place
 Giants Stadium’s Astroturf was replaced with natural grass

Uniform and logo changes

 The Baltimore Ravens introduced a new Ravens wordmark logo, a new Ravens shield logo was placed on the sleeve ends, and there was new pants stripping with the "B" logo on hips.
 The Kansas City Chiefs began wearing red pants with their white jerseys for first time since 1988.
 The New England Patriots introduced new uniforms, changing their primary color from royal to nautical blue. The new white jerseys were worn with blue block numbers and blue pants.
 The New Orleans Saints updated their fleur-de-lis helmet logo to be a bit smaller but with a wider white and black outline. Also introduced was an alternative old gold logo. They also returned to wearing old gold pants with their white jerseys.
 The New York Giants unveiled new uniforms. The blue jerseys were a modernized version of the team's design used in the 1950s. The white jerseys still retained elements of the 1980s design (such as the 1980s' blue collars and nameplates, and missing the 1950s' red sleeve stripes) but with red numbers like the 1950s version. Gray pants were worn with both the blue and white jerseys. The helmet also returned to featuring the lowercase "ny" logo. 
 The St. Louis Rams introduced new uniforms, darkening the shades of blue and gold to "New Century Blue" and "Millennium Gold". Among other modifications, the curling rams horns on the sleeves were replaced by a new logo featuring charging ram's head.

Television
This was the third year under the league's eight-year broadcast contracts with ABC, CBS, Fox, and ESPN to televise Monday Night Football, the AFC package, the NFC package, and Sunday Night Football, respectively.

ABC fired Boomer Esiason, reportedly because he and Al Michaels never got along in the MNF booth. The network decided to go in a radical direction by hiring comedian Dennis Miller, along with Dan Fouts, to join Michaels.

Dick Enberg joined CBS, becoming the #2 play-by-play commentator, alongside Dan Dierdorf, while Verne Lundquist returned to call college football for the network. Also, Mike Ditka joined The NFL Today as an analyst.

Notes

External links
Football Outsiders 2000 DVOA Ratings and Commentary
Pro Football Reference.com – 2000

References
 NFL Record and Fact Book
 NFL History 1991–2000 (Last accessed October 17, 2005)
 Total Football: The Official Encyclopedia of the National Football League
 Steelers Fever – History of NFL Rules (Last accessed October 17, 2005)

National Football League seasons
 
National Football League